Saida Khassenova (born 19 August 1986, Karaganda, Kazakh SSR, Soviet Union) is a Kazakhstani boxer. At the 2012 Summer Olympics, she competed in the Women's lightweight competition, but was defeated in the first round.

References

Kazakhstani women boxers
Living people
Olympic boxers of Kazakhstan
Boxers at the 2012 Summer Olympics
Asian Games medalists in boxing
Boxers at the 2010 Asian Games
Asian Games bronze medalists for Kazakhstan
Medalists at the 2010 Asian Games
1986 births
Sportspeople from Karaganda
Lightweight boxers
21st-century Kazakhstani women